The British Academy Television Craft Award for Best Photography & Lighting: Fiction  is one of the categories presented by the British Academy of Film and Television Arts (BAFTA) within the British Academy Television Craft Awards, the craft awards were established in 2000 with their own, separate ceremony as a way to spotlight technical achievements, without being overshadowed by the main production categories. According to the BAFTA website, for this category the "eligibility is limited to the director of photography."

Several categories were presented to recognize photography and lighting in television programming:
 From 1978 to 1991 Best Film Cameramen was presented. 
 From 1978 to 1982 Best Television Cameramen was presented. 
 In 1978 Best Special Lighting Effects was presented.
 From 1978 to 1980 Best Television Lighting was presented.
 From 1981 to 1994 Best Video Lighting was presented.

In 1992, those categories transformed in two, Best Film or Video Photography - Fiction/Entertainment and Best Film or Video Photography - Factual until 1994 when they would be renamed for the last time, resulting in Best Photography & Lighting: Fiction and Best Photography: Factual respectively.

Winners and nominees

1970s
Best Film Cameramen

Best Television Cameramen

Best Special Lighting Effects

Best Television Lighting

1980s
Best Film Cameramen

Best Television Cameramen

Best Television Lighting

Best Video Lighting

1990s
Best Film Cameramen

Best Video Lighting

Best Film or Video Photography - Fiction/Entertainment

Best Photography & Lighting: Fiction

2000s

2010s

2020s

See also
 Primetime Emmy Award for Outstanding Cinematography for a Limited Series or Movie
 Primetime Emmy Award for Outstanding Cinematography for a Single-Camera Series (Half-Hour)
 Primetime Emmy Award for Outstanding Cinematography for a Single-Camera Series (One Hour)

References

External links
 

Photography & Lighting: Fiction